Bagh I Mehtab (literally: Garden of Mehtab) is located in Srinagar, Jammu and Kashmir, India, about 7 km away from city centre, Lal Chowk. The area is primarily a residential area with a government housing colony and many private colonies.

The settled population is majorly Sunni Muslim, immigrated from different parts of Kashmir valley.

Location

The area is located on the banks of the river Doodganga (literally: The Ganges of Milk), which has its source in the upper reaches of Yusmarg.

The locality comes on the Chadoora – Charari Sharief – Yusmarg highway.

The Banihal–Baramula DEMU railway line passes through the railway bridge ending at Bagh e Mehtab periphery. The tiny bridge adjacent to it, is the link for commuters to Rawalpora and Gulzarpora,saving them five to six kilometers of distance.

Nearby localities
 Nowgam
 Chanapora
 Rawalpora
 Astanpora
 Checki Methan alias Beighpora 
 Kralapora 
 Machowa
 Dooniwari
 Shankarpora
 Gopalpora

History

It was named after Mehtab Begum, who migrated to Pakistan after the partition of India in 1947. After the migration, the land was taken by the custodian department of the State.

The whole area was initially an orchard of around 600 kanals, with plum and apple trees planted across the whole area, before its allotment as a residential settlement.

An area in the neighbourhood was used as an interrogation centre by the local police before 1980s. The location now has been converted into a public park, which is nicknamed as 'Jail Park'.

Facilities

The neighbourhood hosts its own public parks, a residential quarter called Sheikh ul Alam apartments, gymnasiums such as Hard Knox and Royal Club, two wheeler retailers, bakeries, fast food points, bathroom equipment, paint and tile shops, carpet and fabric shops, a snooker point, a car service vendor called Haseen Motors, commercial complexes such as Al Gani Plaza and Al Azhar Complex hosting variety of shops including pharmacies, saloons, and restaurants, a marriage hall cum auditorium,  a Jama Masjid, Jammu and Kashmir Bank branch, modern grocery stores such as Blooms, and Urban Mart, Havells electric shop, and India Post facility.  Dr Lal PathLabs collection facility and a  Bharat Petroleum petrol/diesel pump station are a walking distance away.

During summers, Hotel New Sahil, in the neighbourhood, hosts many number of Indian tourists, who mainly come to visit Kashmir in bus tours.

Office of Yusmarg Development Authority is situated in Bagh e Mehtab.

Recently, a public library containing over 45,000 books was opened in the locality.

References 

Srinagar
Srinagar district
Neighbourhoods in Srinagar
Cities and towns in Srinagar district